Guan Qiao (2 July 1935 – 26 December 2022) was a Chinese engineer specializing in welding. He was an academician of the Chinese Academy of Engineering and formerly served as president of the China Welding Association and vice-president of the International Institute of Welding.

Name
His first name, "Qiao", was given by his father, who hoped that Guan Qiao would grow up to be a bridge engineer to revitalize Chinese industry.

Biography
Guan was born in Taiyuan, Shanxi, on July 2, 1935, while his ancestral home is in Xiangfen County. His father was an engineer in water conservancy and railway construction. His mother was a primary school teacher. After the Marco Polo Bridge Incident broke out in 1937, Shanxi was colonised by the Imperial Japanese Army, Guan fled to Shaanxi with his mother and lived in a cave in the mountains of Yichuan County. He secondary studied at Beijing Huiwen Middle School. After studying Russian for a year in Beijing Russian Specialized School, Guan was sent to the Soviet Union to study at the Bauman Moscow State Technical University in 1953. He joined the Communist Party of China in 1956. In 1959 he went back to his alma mater and obtained a K.T.H. degree in 1963. When he returned to China, he served as a senior engineer at the Beijing Aeronautical Manufacturing Technology Research Institute (BAMTRI) (now AVIC Manufacturing Technology Institute). He was president of the China Welding Association from 1990 to 1995 and vice-president of the International Institute of Welding from 1992 to 1995.

Guan was a deputy to the 11th, 12th and 13th National Congress of the Communist Party of China. He was a delegate to the 6th National People's Congress and a member of the 9th and 10th National Committee of the Chinese People's Political Consultative Conference.

Guan died in Beijing on 26 December 2022, at the age of 87.

Selected papers

Honours and awards
 1994 Member of the Chinese Academy of Engineering
 1998 Science and Technology Progress Award of the Ho Leung Ho Lee Foundation 
 1999 Lifetime Achievement Award of the International Institute of Welding
 2005 Lifetime Achievement Award of the China Welding Association
 2005 Brooker Medal of The Welding Institute
 2010 Order of Merit, 3rd class (Ukraine) 
 2017 IIW Fellow Award

References

Bibliography

External links
Guan Qiao on the Chinese Academy of Engineering 

1935 births
2022 deaths
People from Taiyuan
Engineers from Shanxi
Scientists from Shanxi
Chinese mechanical engineers
Bauman Moscow State Technical University alumni
Members of the Chinese Academy of Engineering
Delegates to the National People's Congress from Shanxi
Delegates to the 6th National People's Congress
Members of the 9th Chinese People's Political Consultative Conference
Members of the 10th Chinese People's Political Consultative Conference
20th-century Chinese engineers
21st-century Chinese engineers
Deaths from the COVID-19 pandemic in China
Recipients of the Order of Merit (Ukraine), 3rd class